Patriarch Joseph may refer to:

 Joseph I of Constantinople, Ecumenical Patriarch in 1266–1275 and 1282–1283
 Patriarch Joseph of Moscow and All Russia, ruled in 1642–1652
 Joseph I (Chaldean Patriarch) (reigned in 1681–1696)
 Patriarch Joseph II of Constantinople, Ecumenical Patriarch in 1416–1439
 Joseph II (Chaldean Patriarch), ruled in 1696–1713
 Joseph III (Chaldean Patriarch), ruled in 1713–1757
 Ignatius Joseph III Yonan, Patriarch of Antioch and all the East of the Syrians for the Syriac Catholic Church since 2009
 Joseph IV,  Maronite Patriarch, ruled in 1644–1648
 Joseph IV (Chaldean Patriarch), ruled in 1757–1780
 Joseph Dergham El Khazen, Maronite Patriarch of Antioch in 1733–1742
 Joseph V Augustine Hindi, Patriarch of the Chaldeans for the Chaldean Catholic Church in 1780–1827
 Joseph Estephan, Maronite Patriarch of Antioch in 1766–1793
 Joseph VI Audo, Patriarch of the Chaldean Catholic Church in 1847–1878
 Joseph Tyan, Maronite Patriarch of Antioch in 1796–1809
 Yousef VII Ghanima, Patriarch of the Chaldean Catholic Church in 1947–1958
 Patriarch Joseph VIII, Maronite Patriarch in 1823–1845
 Patriarch Joseph IX, Maronite Patriarch in 1845–1854